Euxanthus is a genus of crabs in the family Xanthidae. 

Containing the following species:

Euxanthus boletarius (Rathbun, 1911)
Euxanthus exsculptus (Herbst, 1790)
Euxanthus herdmani Laurie, 1906
Euxanthus huonii (Hombron & Jacquinot, 1846)
Euxanthus ruali Guinot, 1971
Euxanthus rugosus Miers, 1884

References

Xanthoidea